Shembe may refer to:

Isaiah Shembe
Nazareth Baptist Church
Shembe, Bururi, a village in Burundi
Shembe, Rutana, a village in Burundi
Lungelo Khumbulani Shibzin Jr. Shembe